Hussein Haleem (born 5 March 1969) is a Maldivian long-distance runner. He competed in the men's marathon at the 1988 Summer Olympics and the 1992 Summer Olympics.

References

External links
 

1969 births
Living people
Athletes (track and field) at the 1988 Summer Olympics
Athletes (track and field) at the 1992 Summer Olympics
Maldivian male long-distance runners
Maldivian male marathon runners
Olympic athletes of the Maldives
Place of birth missing (living people)